The Federation Council is a local government area located in the Riverina region of New South Wales, Australia. This area was formed in 2016 from the merger of the Corowa Shire with its neighbouring Urana Shire.

It is bounded to the south by the Murray River and the state of Victoria.

The inaugural mayor of Federation Council is Patrick Bourke from Urana, elected by his fellow councillors on 26 September 2017.

Main towns and villages
In addition to the main urban centres of Corowa,  Urana and Mulwala, localities in the area include Balldale, Boree Creek, Buraja, Coreen, Daysdale, Hopefield, Howlong, Lowesdale, Morundah, Oaklands, Rand, Rennie and Savernake.

Heritage listings
The Federation Council has a number of heritage-listed sites, including:
Corowa Courthouse
Corowa railway station
Corowa Flour Mill
Savernake Station
Urana Soldiers' Memorial Hall

Demographics

Council
Federation Council comprise nine Councillors elected proportionally as a single ward. All Councillors are elected for a fixed four-year term of office.

The interim Administrator of the Federation Council was solicitor and former professional rugby league footballer Mike Eden, until elections were held on 9 September 2017

The most recent election was held on 9 September 2017, and the makeup of the council is as follows:

History
The Federation Council was created by the Government of New South Wales as a result of an amalgamation of some local government bodies through a reform program between 2013 and 2016. As part of the review, all New South Wales local government authorities were assessed by the NSW Independent Pricing and Regulatory Tribunal on their historical and projected demographic data, financial sustainability, and other measures including their impact on the State's resources. Those council deemed "unfit" were asked to nominate their preferred merger partner in order to achieve economies of scale. Corowa and Urana shires both nominated to merge with each other. In addition Lockhart Shire nominated Urana Shire as a preferred merger partner. In December 2015, the Minister for Local Government Paul Toole proposed the amalgamation of all three Councils. All three Councils opposed the proposal and a group of residents in the town of Mulwala in Corowa Shire threatened to secede and join Berrigan Shire if the three-way merger went ahead. Corowa Shire put forward the alternate proposal being a merger of Corowa and Urana shires, despite objections from Urana Shire. The Minister accepted the Corowa and Urana merger proposal and the Federation Council was proclaimed on 12 May 2016.

See also

 Local government areas of New South Wales

References

External links

 
Local government areas of the Riverina
2016 establishments in Australia